The 1990 Campionati Internazionali di Sicilia was a men's tennis tournament played on outdoor clay courts in Palermo, Italy that was part of the World Series of the 1990 ATP Tour. It was the 12th edition of the tournament and took place from 24 September until 30 September 1990. Seventh-seeded Franco Davín won the singles title.

Finals

Singles

 Franco Davín defeated  Juan Aguilera 6–1, 6–1
 It was Davín's 1st singles title of the year and the 2nd of his career.

Doubles

 Sergio Casal /  Emilio Sánchez defeated  Carlos Costa /  Horacio de la Peña 6–3, 6–4

References

External links
 ITF – tournament edition details

Campionati Internazionali di Sicilia
Campionati Internazionali di Sicilia
Campionati Internazionali di Sicilia